Gipnoza is the second album by Kaku P-Model.

Overview
The 2011 Tōhoku earthquake was worked in as a plot device for the album's dystopian science fiction concept story, a sequel to the events of Vistoron, in which the reality-distorting Gipnoza nanobots are being planted inside of people through the food and medicine supply. Other story elements were taken from the 1996 album Convex And Concave by the P-Model/Devo tribute band Pevo.

Yasumi Tanaka, a founding member of P-Model, returned 30 years after his departure from music as a guest performer on "Go for it! Halycon". Pevo's 1go also appeared as a guest musician on "Time-eliminating Light", and performed alongside Susumu Hirasawa at the album's Parallel Kozak live concerts.

Track listing

The tracks with Cyrillic words in their titles are stylized with the Cyrillic word first, followed by the Latin equivalent in brackets.

Personnel
Susumu Hirasawa - All instruments, Programming, Production
Yasumi Tanaka - Electronic keyboard solo on "Go for it! Halycon"
Pevo 1go - Right channel electric guitar on "Time-eliminating Light"
Masanori Chinzei - Mixing, Mastering
Syotaro Takami - Translation
Toshifumi "non graph" Nakai - Design
Presented by Chaos Union/TESLAKITE: Kenji Sato, Rihito Yumoto, Mika Hirano, Kinuko Mochizuki, Misato Oguro

References

External links
Gipnoza
"Parallel Kozak" Live Report

Susumu Hirasawa albums
2013 albums